Miguel de Olaso (born 1980), known professionally as MacGregor, is a Spanish commercial cinematographer and film director based in Los Angeles.

Biography 
MacGregor, a Madrid-born cinematographer based in Los Angeles, CA, known for films such as "Fall" (2022) and "Kandahar" (2023) and for his work on award-winning documentaries such as "The Mauritania Railway: Backbone of the Sahara". He is known for creating visually striking and emotionally impactful films that address social and political issues.

Filmography
Film

Television

Short films

Awards

References

External links 
 Official website 
 

American cinematographers
1980 births
Living people
American film directors
Spanish cinematographers
Spanish film directors